New.Music.Live. (often called NML) was the hour-long flagship show of MuchMusic and the successor of MuchOnDemand which premiered on December 13, 2010 and ended on August 1, 2013. It was broadcast live from MuchMusic's studio at 299 Queen Street West in Toronto.

Concept 
MuchMusic's flagship show delivered the news in music and entertainment, new and popular music videos, live performances, and interviews with artists and celebrities. Viewers in Canada could watch at home and interact with the show via Twitter. Although the show wasn't simulcast, international viewers could watched the show online through their website. Tickets were also available through the website to anyone as long as they can make it to the show.

VJs 
These were the VJs who hosted the program before its cancellation in 2013.
 Lauren Toyota — moved to MTV Canada in 2014, no longer with Bell Media
 Scott Willats — no longer with Bell Media
 Liz Trinnear — currently on etalk
 Phoebe Dykstra — moved to MTV Canada in 2014, left Bell Media
 Chloe Wilde — winner of VJ Search 2013, currently on etalk

Past hosts
 Jesse Giddings — left MuchMusic for E! News in the United States

End 
On August 1, 2013, it was announced live on-air and on Twitter that a new show would come in September and that New.Music.Live. would be done. However, fans were getting the message that a new show similar to New.Music.Live. would arrive during Fall 2013 based on tweets sent on NML'''s Twitter feed. All of MuchMusic's in-house shows like Today's Top 10 and Countdown were moved to MTV's new studio in the same building. The former MuchMusic studio space has now been taken over by CTV's The Social'' and the MuchMusic logo signage outside the building has since been removed.

In 2014, MuchMusic rebranded itself as Much. No new show was ever announced.

References

External links 
 
 

Much (TV channel) original programming
2010s Canadian music television series
2010 Canadian television series debuts
2013 Canadian television series endings
Television shows filmed in Toronto